The 2012 King's Cup was the 41st edition of the tournament which was held in Bangkok, Thailand from 15 January until 21 January. The King's Cup is an international football competition held in Thailand. This edition featured four teams and reverted to a round robin group stage.

Squads

Matches
All times were Indochina Time (ICT) – UTC+7.

Scorers
2 goals

  Simon Christoffersen
  Kim Hyun-sung
  Seo Jung-jin

1 goal

  Tarik Elyounoussi
  Tore Reginiussen
  Martin Spelmann
  Martin Ørnskov Nielsen
  Kim Dong-sub
  Kim Bo-kyung
  Sumanya Purisai
  Teeratep Winothai

References

2012
2011–12 in Danish football
2012 in Thai football
2012 in Norwegian football
2012 in South Korean football